Darnell Harris (born February 2, 1992) is an American professional basketball player who last played for AEK Larnaca of the Cypriot League. He played college basketball at Middle Tennessee.

Early life and high school
Harris was born and grew up in Milwaukee, Wisconsin and originally attended Alexander Hamilton High School. He transferred to Christian Life Center Academy in Houston, Texas before his senior year and completed a fifth year at La Jolla Prep in San Diego, California. Harris initially committed to play basketball at Cleveland State, but an investigation into La Jolla Prep's curriculum did not meet the NCAA's academic requirements and Harris was therefore ineligible to play the next season at the Division I level.

College career

Wisconsin-Whitewater
Harris began his college career playing for NCAA Division III Wisconsin–Whitewater Warhawks, opting to play close to home on at lower level than at a junior college. As a freshman, he averaged 11.4 points and a team-leading six rebounds per game. He opted to transfer to Northwest Florida State College following the end of the season in order to attempt to play basketball at a higher level.

Northwest Florida
Harris spent his sophomore year playing for Northwest Florida State College and committed to play basketball at Middle Tennessee State University before the start of the junior college season. In his only season for the Raiders, Harris averaged 12 points and 5.7 rebounds per game while shooting 53.6 percent from the field and 36.1 percent of three-point attempts in 27 games (18 starts).

Middle Tennessee
In his first season at Middle Tennessee, Harris played in all 36 
of the Blue Raiders games (13 starts) and averaged 6.7 points per game. He averaged 11.7 points and four rebounds per game as a starter during his senior year and scored 15 points in the Blue Raiders' upset of 2nd-seeded Michigan State in the 2016 NCAA tournament.

Professional career

Spirou Charleroi
Harris signed a one-year contract with Spirou Charleroi of the Belgian Pro Basketball League (PBL) on June 28, 2016. In his first professional season, Harris averaged 4.7 points and 2.2 rebounds in 42 PBL games, 5.2 points and 1.8 rebounds in 13 Basketball Champions League games, and 5.5 points and 2.0 rebounds over two FIBA Europe Cup contests.

Liège
Harris stayed in Belgium for a second season after signing with Liège Basket on June 11, 2017. He averaged 9.1 points and 4.4 rebounds per game in 35 games.

Beijing Bucks
Harris played for Beijing Eastern Bucks of the Chinese National Basketball League (NBL), averaging 27.5 points, 7.3 rebounds, 2.9 assists and 1.1 steals in 16 league games.

Panionios
Harris signed with Panionios of the Greek Basket League (GBL) on September 7, 2018. Harris played in 23 GBL games, starting 21, and averaged 10.1 points and 4.6 rebounds per game with Panionios.

Sagesse
Following the end of the Greek League season, Harris signed with CS Sagesse of the Lebanese Basketball League on June 1, 2019. Harris left Sagesse before appearing in a game with the team.

Larisa
On October 7. 2019, Harris returned to Greece and signed with Larisa (under his Panionios coach, Vassilis Fragkias), and replacing Justin Baker.

References

External links
Middle Tennessee Blue Raiders bio
RealGM profile
EuroBasket

1992 births
Living people
AEK Larnaca B.C. players
American expatriate basketball people in Belgium
American expatriate basketball people in China
American expatriate basketball people in Cyprus
American expatriate basketball people in Greece
American expatriate basketball people in Lebanon
American men's basketball players
Basketball players from Milwaukee
Larisa B.C. players
Liège Basket players
Middle Tennessee Blue Raiders men's basketball players
Northwest Florida State Raiders men's basketball players
Panionios B.C. players
Spirou Charleroi players
Wisconsin–Whitewater Warhawks men's basketball players
Power forwards (basketball)